Semir Pepic (born 25 September 1972 in Podgorica, Montenegro) is an Australian judoka. He formerly represented Slovakia. He has six Gold medals from the Australian National Judo Championships and has represented Australia in the Beijing 2008 Olympics.

Achievements

References
 
sports-reference

1972 births
Living people
Judoka at the 1996 Summer Olympics
Olympic judoka of Slovakia
Australian male judoka
Judoka at the 2004 Summer Olympics
Judoka at the 2008 Summer Olympics
Olympic judoka of Australia
Australian people of Bosniak descent